This article concerns the 200 BC decade, that lasted from 209 BC to 200 BC.

References